William Drury "Doc" Allen (February 13, 1886 – December 27, 1979) was an American football and basketball coach. He served as the head football coach at Minot State Teacher's College—now known as Minot State University—in Minot, North Dakota from 1936 to 1945, compiling a record of 21–28–8.  Allen was also the head basketball coach at Minot State from 1937 to 1946, tallying mark of 88–27.

References

External links
 

1886 births
1979 deaths
Minot State Beavers football coaches
Minot State Beavers men's basketball coaches
Sportspeople from Tennessee